Ambrose Aungier, 2nd Earl of Longford (c.1649 – 23 January 1704) was an Anglo-Irish politician and peer. 

Aungier was the son of Ambrose Aungier and Grizzell Bulkeley, daughter of Lancelot Bulkeley. Between 1697 and 1699 he was the Member of Parliament for Longford Borough in the Irish House of Commons. On 23 December 1700, he succeeded his brother, Francis Aungier as Earl of Longford and assumed his seat in the Irish House of Lords. In 1702 he was made a member of the Privy Council of Ireland. Upon his death without issue in 1705, his title became extinct.

References

Year of birth uncertain
1704 deaths
17th-century Anglo-Irish people
18th-century Anglo-Irish people
Irish MPs 1695–1699
Members of the Irish House of Lords
Members of the Parliament of Ireland (pre-1801) for County Longford constituencies
Members of the Privy Council of Ireland